Burke is a ghost town in Shoshone County, Idaho, United States, established in 1887. Once a thriving silver, lead and zinc mining community, the town saw significant decline in the mid-twentieth century after the closure of several mines.

In its early years, Burke was home to the Hercules silver mine, the owners of which were implicated in the Idaho mining wars of 1899. Both the Hecla and Star mines also operated out of Burke, and the town was a significant site during the 1892 Coeur d'Alene labor strike. Burke's location within the narrow  Burke Canyon resulted in unique architectural features, such as a hotel built above the railway and Canyon Creek, with the train track running through a portion of the hotel lobby.

After several natural disasters and years of decline in the mid-twentieth century, Burke mining operations finally ceased in 1991 with the closing of the Star mine. In 2002, about 300 people lived in or nearby Burke Canyon, though Burke itself had no residents.

It is accessed from Wallace on Burke-Canyon Creek Road (State Highway 4).

History

Establishment and labor wars

In 1884, miners discovered an abundance of lead and silver in the Burke Canyon. The first mine in Burke, the Tiger Mine, was discovered in May 1884. That same year, the Tiger Mine was sold to S.S. Glidden for $35,000.

By the end of 1885, over 3,000 tons of ore had been extracted from the Tiger Mine. The high volume of ore being extracted from the mountains led Glidden to begin construction on a railroad from the mine to Wallace. On July 6, 1887, Glidden incorporated the Canyon Creek Railroad, a -wide narrow-gauge railway which operated from Wallace to the Tiger Mine. Additional investors on the Canyon Creek Railroad were Harry M. Glidden, Frank R. Culbertson, Alexander H. Tarbet, and Charles W. O'Neil.

Under Corbin's overseeing, by November 1887,  of tracks had been laid, and it was then that the town of Burke was formally established. The railway was completed in December 1887, and the first shipment of ore to Wallace took place on December 12. In 1888, the town was serviced by trains from the Northern Pacific Railroad and the Oregon Railroad and Navigation Company.

Given its position within the narrow canyon, Burke had to share its boundaries with the Northern Pacific rail spur, resulting in a railway that occupied the street running through town. According to some sources (such as the Northwest Center for Public Health Practice), the limited space forced businesses on the west side of the railway to have to retract their awnings when trains passed through. However, according to Bill Dunphy, a town resident, this was an exaggeration: "It was narrow," he recalled. "They always said that when a train came through Burke, you had to hoist the awnings to get the train through, which wasn't right. But it's a good story."

On February 4, 1890, the first of several avalanches in Burke's history caused major damage to the residences and businesses in the town, and killed three people. In 1891, tensions between miners and the mining companies began to rise. In 1892, hard rock miners in Shoshone County protested wage cuts with a strike. Several lost their lives in a shooting war provoked by the discovery of a company spy named Charles A. Siringo. On the morning of July 11, 1892, gunfight at the nearby Frisco Mill inadvertently ignited a box of dynamite, causing the mill to explode, killing six people. Idaho Governor Frank Steunenberg declared martial law and sent the U.S. Army and National Guard into the canyon to keep the peace.

Development and further unrest

Burke continued development with the construction of the Tiger Hotel, a 150-room hotel originally built in 1896 as boarding rooms for miners; the hotel took its namesake from the Tiger Mine. A grease fire severely damaged the hotel shortly after its opening in 1896, killing three people. Subsequent widening of the railroad in 1906 forced the hotel to accommodate. The hotel, which straddled the main street and Canyon Creek, was modified to allow the railroad to run through its lobby. An enclosed walkway was constructed above the railroad for hotel guests to move between the two halves of the hotel without worry about the train or the weather.

Around 1896, Socialist leader Eugene V. Debs had grown prominent in the Pacific Northwest, and addressed miners in Burke in early 1897. Two years later, hostilities erupted once again in 1899. In response to the Bunker Hill company firing seventeen men for joining the union, the miners dynamited the Bunker Hill & Sullivan mill. Lives were lost once again, and the army intervened. While the Hecla mine continued to prosper, the city saw further destruction in February 1910 when another avalanche struck the town, killing twenty residents. Six months later, the Great Fire of 1910 caused further damage to the Burke Canyon.

In 1913, significant flooding impacted the town, with sediment and debris building up against the Tiger Hotel as water cascaded down the gulch. The town was impacted by further damage on July 23, 1923, when another fire broke out, causing extensive damage to numerous buildings in the town. Most notably damaged by the fire was the Tiger Hotel, which became increasingly unprofitable in the 1940s and was torn down in 1954.

Decline and abandonment
By the mid-twentieth century, mining operations in Burke had slowed after the closure of several mines. The last mine in Burke closed in 1991. According to U.S. census data, there were a total of fifteen residents in Burke in 1990.

As of 2012, the Hecla Mining Company explored the potential of exploiting additional resource deposits in the Star mine. As of December 31, 2012, Hecla invested $7 million in rehabilitation and exploration with published estimates suggesting the potential to recover in excess of 25 million ounces of silver from the site with significant zinc and lead deposits also present.

Climate
Burke is marked by warm summers and cold, snowy winters. The town is classified as having a continental climate by the Köppen climate classification. Due to its positioning deep within the narrow Burke Canyon, winters in Burke have been noted for being particularly harsh, with the town only receiving 3 hours of complete sunlight per day.

Notable people
Wyatt Earp (1848–1929), lawman, lived in a camp adjacent to Burke, known as Eagle City, circa 1885 
Lana Turner (1921–1995), actress, lived in Burke in her early childhood

Gallery

See also
List of ghost towns in Idaho
Burke Canyon
Coeur d'Alene, Idaho labor strike of 1892

Notes

References

Works cited

External links

History of the Idaho mining wars via Idaho State University
Photo collection of Burke and Frisco Mill via the University of Washington

1887 establishments in Idaho Territory
Geography of Shoshone County, Idaho
Ghost towns in Idaho
History of Idaho
Mining communities in Idaho
Railway towns in Idaho